Hadar is a name which is used as given name and surname. People with the name include:

Given name
 Hadar Cars (born 1933), Swedish politician
 Hadar Rubinstein (born 1967), Israeli Olympic swimmer

Surname
 Leon Hadar, global affairs analyst, journalist, blogger and author
 Zvika Hadar (born 1966), Israeli actor, comedian, and television host

See also
 Hadar (disambiguation)

Jewish given names
Jewish surnames